This article describes the knockout stage of the 2020–21 LEN Euro League Women.

The 2020–21 Euro League Women knockout phase began on 27 February with the playoffs and ended on 1 May 2021 with the final. Olympiacos won the title.

Qualified teams
The knockout phase involves the sixteen teams which qualified as winners and runners-up of each of the eight groups in the qualification round.

Quarterfinals
The draw for the eight-finals was held on 7 February 2021. The first legs were played on 27 February, and the second legs were played on 13 March 2021.

Overview

|}

Matches

18–18 on aggregate. Dynamo Uralochka won 6–5 on penalties.

Olympiacos won 22–19 on aggregate.

UVSE Hunguest Hotel won 21–18 on aggregate.

Dunaújváros won 21–17 on aggregate.

Final four
The draw took place on 23 March 2021. The final four will held at the Danube Arena in Budapest, Hungary on 30 April and 1 May 2021.

Bracket

Notes

References

External links
, len.microplustiming.com

Knockout Phase